The 1st Infantry Division (1-ya Pekhotnaya Diviziya) was an infantry formation of the Russian Imperial Army that existed in various formations from 1811 until the end of World War I and the Russian Revolution. From at least 1903 to the end of its existence the division was based in Smolensk.

History 
It was initially formed in 1811 as the 25th Infantry Division, and renumbered as the 1st in 1820. The division took part in the Russo-Japanese War and was located in Manchuria during that time. In August 1914 it was part of the 2nd Army of the Northwestern Front. It was completely destroyed during the Russian invasion of East Prussia by September of that year and was reformed in December 1914. In 1915–17 it was assigned to the 12th Army, 5th Army, and later the 1st Army. It was demobilized around the time of the Russian Revolution and the subsequent unrest.

Organization 
Russian infantry divisions consisted of a staff, two infantry brigades, and one artillery brigade. It was part of the 13th Army Corps as of 1914.
1st Brigade
 1st Neva Infantry Regiment
 2nd Sofia Infantry Regiment
2nd Brigade
 3rd Narva Infantry Regiment
 4th Koporye Infantry Regiment
1st Artillery Brigade

Known commanders

Known chiefs of staff

References 

Infantry divisions of the Russian Empire
Military units and formations established in 1811
Military units and formations disestablished in 1918
Smolensk Governorate